Favali is a surname. Notable people with the surname include:

 Federico Favali (born 1981), Italian composer
 Tullio Favali (1946–1985), Italian priest
  (born 1970), French actress
 Giuseppe Favalli (born 1972), Italian footballer